True Brew is the eighth studio album by Swedish punk rock band Millencolin. It was first released on 22 April 2015. Stylistically, True Brew returns to the faster punk rock sound of Millencolin's 90s releases and marks a departure from the more alternative rock driven sound that dominated the albums since Pennybridge Pioneers. Unlike past releases, the album is more political in tone, evident in songs such as Sense & Sensibility which condemns the rise of right-wing populist parties in many countries of Europe.

Track listing 
 "Egocentric Man" – 2:34
 "Chameleon" – 2:58
 "Autopilot Mode" – 2:00
 "Bring Me Home" – 2:27
 "Sense & Sensibility" – 2:37
 "True Brew" – 3:22
 "Perfection Is Boring" – 2:59
 "Wall of Doubt" – 2:45
 "Something I Would Die For" – 2:51
 "Silent Suicide" – 1:20
 "Man of 1000 Tics" – 2:52
 "Mr. Fake Believe" – 2:36
 "Believe in John" – 3:21

Personnel
Nikola Sarcevic – lead vocals, bass
Erik Ohlsson – guitar, keyboards, album artwork
Mathias Färm – guitar, percussion, keyboards, assistant engineer, editing
Fredrik Larzon – drums, percussion

Charts

References

External links

True Brew at YouTube (streamed copy where licensed)

2015 albums
Millencolin albums
Epitaph Records albums